Ralph McLean may refer to:

 Ralph McLean (broadcaster), Northern Irish TV presenter and radio DJ
 Ralph McLean (politician) (1957–2010), Australian politician